Planina v Podbočju is a remote small village in the Gorjanci Hills in the Municipality of Krško in eastern Slovenia, right on the border with Croatia. The area is part of the traditional region of Lower Carniola. It is now included in the Lower Sava Statistical Region.

Name
The name of the settlement was changed from Planina to Planina v Podbočju in 1953.

History
Between 14 and 15 September 1942, during the Second World War, the village was burned to the ground and 34 male villagers were executed in the nearby forest by the Ustaše. There is a monument with a list of names of the dead in the village. It is a stone block with a statue of a Partisan on top, unveiled in 1953.

References

External links
Planina v Podbočju on Geopedia

Populated places in the Municipality of Krško